Bell Township is a township in Clearfield County, Pennsylvania, United States. The population was 687 at the 2020 census.

Geography 
Bell Township is located in western Clearfield County and is bordered on the west by Jefferson and Indiana counties. The borough of Mahaffey is in the southeastern part of the township but is a separate municipality. The West Branch Susquehanna River crosses the southern part of the township from southwest to east, passing through Mahaffey. Chest Creek enters the West Branch from the south at Mahaffey.

Communities 
Bethlehem
Clover Run
McGees Mills (McGees Mills Covered Bridge)
Middleton
Newtonburg
Ostend
Ridge
Rowles

Demographics 

As of the census of 2000, there were 825 people, 315 households, and 233 families residing in the township.  The population density was 14.5 people per square mile (5.6/km).  There were 452 housing units at an average density of 8.0/sq mi (3.1/km).  The racial makeup of the township was 99.03% White, 0.24% Native American, 0.12% Asian, 0.12% from other races, and 0.48% from two or more races. Hispanic or Latino of any race were 0.24% of the population.

There were 315 households, out of which 32.7% had children under the age of 18 living with them, 64.8% were married couples living together, 4.8% had a female householder with no husband present, and 26.0% were non-families. 24.1% of all households were made up of individuals, and 12.1% had someone living alone who was 65 years of age or older.  The average household size was 2.62 and the average family size was 3.08.

In the township the population was spread out, with 24.1% under the age of 18, 7.3% from 18 to 24, 26.8% from 25 to 44, 24.7% from 45 to 64, and 17.1% who were 65 years of age or older.  The median age was 39 years. For every 100 females, there were 101.7 males.  For every 100 females age 18 and over, there were 96.9 males.

The median income for a household in the township was US$24,779, and the median income for a family was $32,768. Males had a median income of $26,389 versus $20,694 for females. The per capita income for the township was $12,090.  About 11.9% of families and 17.3% of the population were below the poverty line, including 22.6% of those under age 18 and 9.2% of those age 65 or over.

Education 
Bell Township is located within the Purchase Line School District.

References

External links
 History of Bell

Populated places established in 1820
1820 establishments in Pennsylvania
Townships in Clearfield County, Pennsylvania
Townships in Pennsylvania